Cercosaura is a genus of lizards in the family Gymnophthalmidae. The genus is endemic to South America.

Taxonomy
The genus Cercosaura includes 18 species according to studies that transfer species from the two genera Pantodactylus and Prionodactylus to this genus.

Species 
The genus Cercosaura contains the following recognized species:

Cercosaura anomala  – anomalous cercosaura
Cercosaura anordosquama 
Cercosaura argulus  – elegant eyed lizard, white-lipped prionodactylus
Cercosaura bassleri  – ocellated tegu
Cercosaura doanae 
Cercosaura eigenmanni   – Eigenmann's prionodactylus
Cercosaura hypnoides 
Cercosaura manicata  – slender prionodactylus
Cercosaura nigroventris 
Cercosaura ocellata  – ocellated tegu
Cercosaura olivacea  – olive tegu
Cercosaura oshaughnessyi  – white-striped eyed lizard
Cercosaura pacha  
Cercosaura parkeri  – Parker's many-fingered teiid
Cercosaura phelpsorum 
Cercosaura quadrilineata  –  lined many-fingered teiid
Cercosaura schreibersii  – Schreibers' many-fingered teiid, long-tailed little lizard
Cercosaura steyeri 

Nota bene: A binomial authority in parentheses indicates that the species was originally described in a genus other than Cercosaura.

References

Further reading
Boulenger GA (1885). Catalogue of the Lizards in the British Museum (Natural History). Second Edition. Volume II. ... Teiidæ ... London: Trustees of the British Museum (Natural History). (Taylor and Francis, printers). xiii + 497 pp. + Plates I-XXIV. (Genus Cercosaura, p. 395).
Wagler J (1830). Natürliches System der AMPHIBIEN, mit vorangehender Classification der SÄUGTHIERE und VÖGEL. Ein Beitrag zur vergleichenden Zoologie. Munich, Stuttgart and Tübingen: J.G. Cotta. vi + 354 pp. + one plate. (Cercosaura, new genus, p. 158). (in German and Latin).

 
Lizard genera
Taxa named by Johann Georg Wagler